Guaynabo is a city, suburb of San Juan and municipality in the northern part of Puerto Rico, located in the northern coast of the island, north of Aguas Buenas, south of Cataño, east of Bayamón, and west of San Juan. Guaynabo is spread over 9 barrios and Guaynabo Pueblo (the downtown area and the administrative center of the suburb). Guaynabo is considered, along with its neighbors – San Juan and the municipalities of Bayamón, Carolina, Cataño, Trujillo Alto, and Toa Baja – to be part of the San Juan metropolitan area. It is also part of the larger San Juan-Caguas-Guaynabo Metropolitan Statistical Area, (the largest MSA in Puerto Rico).

The municipality is known for being an affluent suburb of San Juan and for its former Irish heritage. The studios of WAPA-TV is located in Guaynabo.

History
The first European settlement in Puerto Rico, Caparra, was founded in 1508 by Juan Ponce de León in land that is today part of Guaynabo. Ponce de León resided there as first Spanish governor of Puerto Rico. This settlement was abandoned in 1521 in favor of San Juan. The ruins of Caparra remain and are a U.S. National Historic Landmark. The Museum of the Conquest and Colonization of Puerto Rico, which features artifacts from the site and others in Puerto Rico, is located on the grounds.

The municipality of Guaynabo was founded in 1769 by Pedro R. Davila (P.R.), after a struggle for division from the municipality of Bayamón. Previously, the municipality was known as Buinabo, a name that it is popularly said to mean in Taíno "Here is another place of fresh water." Irish officer Thomas O'Daly and fellow Irishman Miguel Kirwan settled the area in the late 18th century and developed a farm and sugarcane plantation he named Hacienda San Patricio. The plantation no longer exists but the land on which it was located is now the central business district of Guaynabo and the San Patricio Plaza shopping mall.

On September 20, 2017 Hurricane Maria struck Puerto Rico.  In Guaynabo, where 26.9% of the population live below the poverty level, 2800 homes were destroyed. The hurricane triggered numerous landslides in Guaynabo. Then president Donald Trump and his wife, Melania Trump visited Guaynabo. Due to the municipality's fiscal difficulties, it was not until April 2, 2019, over a year and half later, that the overtime pay owed to municipal workers was paid.

After 24 years as mayor, Héctor O'Neill García resigned in 2017 when allegations surfaced of sexual harassment toward a female municipal employee. He was replaced in a run-off election by Angel Pérez Otero, who in turn was forced out due to his arrest for Federal corruption allegations in 2021. Héctor O'Neill's son Edward O'Neill Rosa won the following run-off election to succeed him as mayor in January 2022.

Geography
Guaynabo is on the northern side.

Barrios

Like all municipalities of Puerto Rico, Guaynabo is subdivided into barrios.

Camarones
Frailes
Guaraguao
Guaynabo barrio-pueblo
Hato Nuevo
Mamey
Pueblo Viejo
Río
Santa Rosa
Sonadora

Sectors

Barrios (which are like minor civil divisions) in turn are further subdivided into smaller local populated place areas/units called sectores (sectors in English). The types of sectores may vary, from normally sector to urbanización to reparto to barriada to residencial, among others.

Special Communities

 (Special Communities of Puerto Rico) are marginalized communities whose citizens are experiencing a certain amount of social exclusion. A map shows these communities occur in nearly every municipality of the commonwealth. Of the 742 places that were on the list in 2014, the following barrios, communities, sectors, or neighborhoods were in Guaynabo: Amelia, Buen Samaritano, Camarones barrio, Corea, El Polvorín, Honduras, Jerusalén, Los Filtros, Sector El Laberinto, Sector La Pajilla, Sector Los Ratones (Camino Feliciano), Sector San Miguel, Trujillo, Sector Tomé, Vietnam, and Villa Isleña.

Demographics

Tourism

Landmarks and places of interest

 Rancho de Apa (restaurant)
Centro de Bellas Artes (Guaynabo Performing Arts Center)
Caparra Ruins
Caribe Recreational Center
Iglesia Parroquial de San Pedro Mártir
La Marquesa Forest Park
Paseo Tablado
Mario Morales Coliseum
San Patricio Plaza
Caparra Country Club
Plaza Guaynabo
Museum of Transportation
Museo del Deporte
Fort Buchanan

Economy
Several businesses have their headquarters or local Puerto Rican branches in Guaynabo. El Nuevo Día, Chrysler, Santander Securities, Puerto Rico Telephone, and many sales offices for large US and international firms (such as Total, Microsoft, Toshiba, Puma Energy and others) have their Puerto Rican headquarters in Guaynabo. WAPA-TV (Televicentro) and Univision Puerto Rico have their main studios in Guaynabo.

Iberia's San Juan-area offices are in Guaynabo.

Crime
Carjackings have been an ongoing problem in Guaynabo, Puerto Rico and in 2014 the FBI reported a carjacking that occurred in Camarones.

Climate

Culture

Festivals and events
Guaynabo celebrates its patron saint festival in April. The  is a religious and cultural celebration that generally features parades, games, artisans, amusement rides, regional food, and live entertainment.

Other festivals and events celebrated in Guaynabo include:
 Three Kings Festival – January
 Mabó Carnival – February
 Mothers’ Day celebration – May
 National Salsa Day – June
 Fine Arts camp and recreation and sports camp – June
 Bomba and Plena (folkloric music and dance) Festival – October
 Official lighting of Christmas Lights – November

Sports
Guaynabo's old BSN team, the Guaynabo Mets, won national championships in 1980, 1982 and 1989, commanded by the player whom the Mario Morales Coliseum was named after, Mario "Quijote" Morales. The Conquistadores de Guaynabo, or Guaynabo Conquistadores, are the Guaynabo Mets replacement and still play in the Mario Morales Coliseum. The Mets de Guaynabo are the local women's volleyball team that play in the Liga de Voleibol Superior Femenino (LVSF). They have not won any championships yet. They also play in the Mario Morales Coliseum. Guaynabo Fluminense FC is Guaynabo's professional soccer team that plays in the Puerto Rico Soccer League. The league started in 2008 and Guaynabo's current position in the league is 4th place. Guaynabo Fluminense FC play their matches at the Jose Bonano Stadium that was originally made for baseball, but became a soccer arena after the Puerto Rico Baseball League was cancelled for the 2008 season. It was at the same year that the Puerto Rico Soccer League was starting to take place. In the 2009 season, Guaynabo Fluminense FC moved to the Sixto Escobar Stadium.

 Mets de Guaynabo (women's volleyball) - Liga de Voleibol Superior Femenino (LVSF)
 Mets de Guaynabo (men's volleyball) - Liga de Voleibol Superior Masculino (LVSM)
 Guaynabo Conquistadores (basketball) - Baloncesto Superior Nacional (BSN)
 Mets de Guaynabo (basketball) - Baloncesto Superior Nacional (BSN)
 Mets de Guaynabo (baseball) - Federación de Béisbol Aficionado de Puerto Rico (Béisbol Doble A)
 Guaynabo Fluminense FC (soccer) - Puerto Rico Soccer League (PRSL)

Government and infrastructure
The United States Postal Service operates two post offices, Guaynabo and Caparra Heights, in Guaynabo.

The Federal Bureau of Prisons operates the Metropolitan Detention Center, Guaynabo in Guaynabo.

Some regions of the city belong to the Puerto Rico Senatorial district I while others belong to the Puerto Rico Senatorial district II. Both of the Districts are represented by two Senators. In 2016, Henry Neumann and Miguel Romero were elected as Senators for District I, while Migdalia Padilla and Carmelo Ríos have been serving as Senators for District II since being elected in 2004.

Mayors

Mayors of Guaynabo from 1969 to present

Mayors of Guaynabo from 1782 to 1969 
{| class="wikitable"
|-
! Term
! Name
|-
| 1782
| Cayetano de la Sarna
|-
| 1800
| Pedro Dávila
|-
| 1812
| Dionisio Cátala
|-
| 1816
| Angel Umpierre
|-
| 1818
| Juan José González
|-
| 1821
| Joaquín Goyena
|-
| 1822
| José María Prosis
|-
| 1823
| Simón Hinonio
|-
| 1825
| José R. Ramírez
|-
| 1827
| Antonio Guzmán
|-
| 1828
| Genaro Oller
|-
| 1836
| Andrés Degal
|-
| 1836
| Agustín Rosario
|-
| 1840
| Francisco Hiques
|-
| 1844
| Martínez Díaz
|-
| 1848
| Tomás Cátla
|-
| 1849
| Andrés Vega
|-
| 1852
| Justo García
|-
| 1856
| José Tomás Sagarra
|-
| 1857
| Manuel Manzano
|-
| 1859
| Juan Floret
|-
| 1859
| José Francisco Chiques
|-
| 1862
| Segundo de Echeverte
|-
| 1862
| José de Murgas
|-
| 1869
| Juan J. Caro
|-
| 1873
| Benito Gómez
|-
| 1874
| Manuel Millones
|-
| 1876
| José Otero
|-
| 1891
| Juan Díaz de Barrio
|-
| 1914
| José Ramón
|-
| 1914
| José Carazo
|-
| 1919
| Narciso Vall-llobera Feliú
|-
| 1924
| Zenón Díaz Valcárcel
|-
| 1936
| Dolores Valdivieso
|-
| 1944
| Augosto Rivera
|-
| 1948
| Jorge Gavillán Fuentes
|-
| 1956
| Juan Román
|-
| 1964
| José Rosario Reyes
|}

Symbols
The  has an official flag and coat of arms.

Flag
This municipality has a flag.

Coat of arms
This municipality has a coat of arms.

Health facilities
Professional Hospital Guaynabo located on Felisa Rincón Avenue (formerly Las Cumbres Avenue), is the newest hospital infrastructure built in Puerto Rico. Guaynabo is the only city in Puerto Rico to have a hospital specialized in advanced vascular surgery. Some of the first and newest procedures performed in Puerto Rico during 2009 were done in Professional Hospital Guaynabo, including the first AxiaLIF surgery for lumbar fusion.

Transportation
The Tren Urbano has only one station in the municipality, Torrimar Station.
Guaynabo has a bus network called “Guaynabo City Transport”.
There are 63 bridges in Guaynabo.

Notable people
 Tomas Nido, Baseball Catcher for the New York Mets
 Iván DeJesús Jr., Baseball player infielder

Education

Guaynabo is home to Atlantic University College, which specializes in new media art.

The Japanese Language School of Puerto Rico (プエルトリコ補習授業校 Puerutoriko Hoshū Jugyō Kō), a weekend Japanese school, previously held its classes in Guaynabo. It closed in March 2006.

International relations
Guaynabo serves as a host city to four foreign consulates with business in Puerto Rico:

Gallery

See also

List of Puerto Ricans
History of Puerto Rico
Did you know-Puerto Rico?

References

External links
Guaynabo and its barrios, United States Census Bureau
Historic Places in Puerto Rico and the Virgin Islands, a National Park Service Discover Our Shared Heritage Travel Itinerary
 Guaynabo Municipality on Facebook

 
Municipalities of Puerto Rico
Populated places established in 1769
San Juan–Caguas–Guaynabo metropolitan area
1769 establishments in the Spanish Empire